The ALCO DL-202-2 and DL-203-2 diesel-electric locomotive (known informally as the Black Maria) was an experimental freight locomotive produced by ALCO of Schenectady, New York. The primary diesel builders Alco, Baldwin and EMD pushed the War Production Board (WPB) for more opportunities to build more diesels. The Transportation Equipment Division of the WPB announced a production schedule on December 10, 1943, that allowed Alco to build one 4500 horsepower experimental diesel locomotive. This experimental diesel locomotive was to be built in the fourth quarter of 1944. The two A units were built in January 1945 and the B unit at a later date in 1945. The two A units were put on test at Building No. 37 at Schenectady to work out problems with the connecting rods and  turbocharger in the Alco 241 engine, developed by both McIntosh and Seymour and ALCo. The total production run included 2 cab DL202-2 A units, and a single DL203-2 B (cabless booster) unit. The units were released for test in September 1945.
With the B-B wheel arrangement and carbody construction, equipment layout and electrical gear these experimental units were the immediate predecessors of the FA units to come in early 1946. Outwardly, the bodies strongly resembled those on the DL-109, some of which were still under construction at Schenectady in early 1945.

The three units were numbered 1500A, B, C and were tested on the New York Central Railroad, the Delaware and Hudson Railroad, the New York, New Haven and Hartford Railroad, and the Bangor and Aroostook Railroad,
among others. As no orders materialized for such units, and no railroad bought the demonstrators, the set was scrapped in Schenectady New York September 1947.

References

Notes

Bibliography

 Pre-FA (Black Maria) by W. A. Cuisinier (Preston Cook) Extra 2200 South Issue #34 pp. 17–18 includes line drawings and equipment layouts by Cuisinier.
 
  Chapter VII ALCO and World War II pp. 221–230.

External links
 A picture of The Black Maria in service
 Drawings of both the "A" and "B" units, plus additional information about them
 http://alcoworld.railfan.net/arf.htm

ALCO locomotives
B-B locomotives
Experimental locomotives
Railway locomotives introduced in 1945
Locomotives with cabless variants
Passenger locomotives
Scrapped locomotives
Standard gauge locomotives of the United States
Streamlined diesel locomotives